Agnew may refer to:

People
 Agnew (surname)
 Agnew baronets, a title in Scotland and England
 Clan Agnew, a Scottish lowland clan
 Jeff Agnew (born 1965), American stock car racing driver
 Spiro Agnew (1918–1996), Vice President of the United States

Places

Australia
 Agnew, Western Australia
 Agnew Gold Mine, a gold mine in Western Australia

United States
 Agnew, Michigan
 Agnew, Nebraska
 Agnew, Washington
 Agnew, West Virginia
 Agnew's Village, California
 Agnew Depot

Other uses
 Agnew, a type of black box (telephone hacking device)

See also 
 Agnews Developmental Center
 Thomas Agnew & Sons, a fine arts dealer in London